Surigao del Sur's 1st congressional district is one of the two congressional districts of the Philippines in the province of Surigao del Sur. It has been represented in the House of Representatives since 1987. The district consists of the provincial capital city of Tandag and the northern municipalities of Bayabas, Cagwait, Cantilan, Carmen, Carrascal, Cortes, Lanuza, Lianga, Madrid, Marihatag, San Agustin, San Miguel and Tago. It is currently represented in the 18th Congress by Prospero Pichay Jr. of the Lakas–CMD.

Representation history

Election results

2019

2016

2013

2010

See also
Legislative districts of Surigao del Sur

References

Congressional districts of the Philippines
Politics of Surigao del Sur
1987 establishments in the Philippines
Congressional districts of Caraga
Constituencies established in 1987